U.S. Franchise Systems was a franchise company that owned Microtel Inns and Suites and Hawthorn Suites. It was founded in 1995 by Michael A. Leven and Neil K. Aronson.

In March 1996, the company acquired the franchise rights to Hawthorn Suites, and acquired full ownership of the brand on March 12, 1998.

In 1998, U.S. Franchise Systems, Inc. announced that it has purchased Best Inns Suites. US Franchise Systems later sold the America's Best Inn (formerly Best Inns) chain to the Country Hearth Inns chain (since renamed America's Best Franchising Inc.) in 2005.

Neil Aronson would later leave after the sale to Pritzker family in 2000, to form Roark Capital Group. Mike Leven retired in 2007.

In 2000, Pritzker family of Chicago, who owns Hyatt, purchased the company. However by 2008, Hyatt sold it to Wyndham Worldwide.

References 

Hospitality companies established in 1995
Hospitality companies disestablished in 2008
Wyndham Destinations
Hotel chains in the United States
Hyatt Hotels and Resorts